Olivier Danvy is a French computer scientist specializing in programming languages, partial evaluation, and continuations. He is a professor at Yale-NUS College in Singapore.

Danvy received his PhD degree from the Université Paris VI in 1986.
He is notable for the number of scientific papers which acknowledge his help.  Writing in Nature, editor Declan Butler reports on an analysis of acknowledgments on nearly one third of a million scientific papers and reports that Danvy is "the most thanked person in computer science".

Danvy himself is quoted as being "stunned to find my name at the top of the list", ascribing his position to a "series of coincidences": he is multidisciplinary, is well travelled, is part of an international PhD programme, is a networker, and belongs to a university department with a long tradition of having many international visitors.

References

External links
 Home page
 About AU: Olivier Danvy – Professor
 AU Home page
 
 

Year of birth missing (living people)
Living people
Pierre and Marie Curie University alumni
French computer scientists
French expatriates in Denmark
Danish computer scientists
Programming language researchers
Academic staff of Aarhus University